George Kung-chao Yeh (1904–1981), also known as Yeh Kung-chao, was a diplomat and politician of the Republic of China. Educated in the U.S. and the U.K., he graduated from Amherst College in 1925 and later Cambridge University. He taught English literature at Beijing's Tsinghua University, where his students included renowned 20th century Chinese writer Ch'ien Chung-shu. He was the first Minister of Foreign Affairs since 1949. During his tenure, he signed the Sino-Japanese Peace Treaty in 1952 and the Sino-American Mutual Defense Treaty in 1954. He was ambassador to the United States from 1958 to 1961. In 1961, due to the admission of Mongolia to the United Nations, Yeh was removed from the position of ambassador and recalled to Taiwan by Chiang Kai-shek. He then served as Minister without Portfolio.

See also
 Mongolia–Taiwan relations

References

Further reading
 Matray, James I., ed. East Asia and the United States: an encyclopedia of relations since 1784. (2 vol, Greenwood, 2002) 2:691–692.

1904 births
1981 deaths
Ambassadors of China to the United States
Senior Advisors to President Chiang Ching-kuo
Foreign Ministers of the Republic of China
Ambassadors of the Republic of China to the United States
Kuomintang politicians in Taiwan
Nanyang Model High School alumni
Amherst College alumni
Politicians from Jiujiang
Republic of China politicians from Jiangxi
Academic staff of the National Southwestern Associated University